The 2016–17 Senior Women's One Day League was the 11th edition of the women's List A cricket competition in India. It took place in October 2016, with 27 teams divided into an Elite Group and a Plate Group. Railways won the tournament by topping the Elite Group Super League, whilst Himachal Pradesh and Uttar Pradesh were promoted from the Plate Group.

Competition format
The 27 teams competing in the tournament were divided into the Elite Group and the Plate Group, with the 10 teams in the Elite Group further divided into Groups A and B and the 17 teams in the Plate Group into Groups A, B and C. The tournament operated on a round-robin format, with each team playing every other team in their group once. The top two sides from each Elite Group progressed to the Elite Group Super League, which was a further round-robin group, with the winner of the group being crowned Champions. The bottom side from each Elite Group was relegated to the Plate Group for the following season. Meanwhile, the top two from each Plate Group progressed to a knockout stage, with the two teams that reached the final being promoted for the following season, as well as playing off for the Plate Group title. Matches were played using a 50 over format.

The groups worked on a points system with positions with the groups being based on the total points. Points were awarded as follows:

Win: 4 points. 
Tie: 2 points. 
Loss: 0 points. 
No Result/Abandoned: 2 points.

If points in the final table are equal, teams are separated by most wins, then head-to-head record, then Net Run Rate.

Elite Group

Teams

Elite Group A 

 Advanced to Super League
 Relegated to Plate Group

The Elite Group A comprised Maharashtra, Delhi, Baroda, Hyderabad and Goa. While Maharashtra won all four games of the league phase to qualify for the Super League, Delhi qualified on the basis of Net Run Rate after winning two of their four matches.

Elite Group B 

 Advanced to Super League
 Relegated to Plate Group

The Elite Group B comprised Madhya Pradesh, Railways, Andhra, Punjab and Mumbai. Madhya Pradesh finished at the top of the table with two wins from four games, while Railways finished in second position. They won one match, with their other three matches ending in no result.

Elite Group Super League 
Railways emerged as champions of the 2016–17 Senior Women's One Day League. The Mithali Raj-led team won all their three matches in the Super League phase to finish at the top of the table and claim the title, while Maharashtra finished as runners-up.

Fixtures

Plate Group

Teams

Plate Group A 

 Advanced to Plate Group Semi-finals
 Advanced to Plate Group Quarter-finals

Plate Group B 

 Advanced to Plate Group Quarter-finals

Plate Group C 

 Advanced to Plate Group Semi-finals
 Advanced to Plate Group Quarter-finals

Knockout stage

Quarter-finals

Semi-finals

Final

Statistics

Most runs

Source: CricketArchive

Most wickets

Source: CricketArchive

References

2016-17
2016–17 Indian women's cricket
Domestic cricket competitions in 2016–17